Norman Budd (1914–2006) was a British-born actor in American films and television. He also acted on stage.

Selected filmography
 The Cave Dwellers (1940)
 The Gamblers (1949)
 The Judge (1949)
 The Red Menace (1949)
 Women from Headquarters (1950)
 Million Dollar Pursuit (1951)
 Tropical Heat Wave (1952)
 The Atomic City (1952)

References

Bibliography
  Len D. Martin. The Republic Pictures Checklist: Features, Serials, Cartoons, Short Subjects and Training Films of Republic Pictures Corporation, 1935-1959. McFarland, 1998.

External links

1914 births
2006 deaths
American male stage actors
American male film actors
British male film actors
British emigrants to the United States
Male actors from Liverpool
20th-century American male actors